A Central Forest Reserve is a body of forest or woodland managed by the National Forestry Authority (NFA) under the National Forestry and Tree Planting Act 8/2003.

The NFA is mandated to manage all 506 Central Forest Reserves in Uganda. These reserves are part of the protected areas of Uganda. The total area of land covered is 12,657.47 km² or 6.3% of the total land area of Uganda.  They compose of natural forest like moist semi-deciduous forests and forest plantations mainly of pine and eucalyptus species. Legal activities done under the NFA are harvesting timber, re-planting and tourism.

List of Central Forest Reserves in Uganda:

See also
 Albertine Rift montane forests
 Bwamba Forest
 Bwindi Impenetrable Forest
 Kibale Forest

References

Reserves
Forest reserves of Uganda
Reserves